Maksims Rafaļskis (born 14 May 1984) is a Latvian football manager, currently coaching the youth squad of Latvian Higher League club Metta, and former footballer.

Club career
Rafaļskis played for JFC Skonto in his youth years, but started his professional career with FK Rīga in 2005. He played there for 3 years, making 67 league appearances and scoring 3 goals, also helping his team in cup competitions. Rafaļskis left the team in 2008, because it struggled with its financial situation and could not guarantee his contract being satisfied. Not long after leaving he signed a contract with FK Liepājas Metalurgs. He played there for 2 years, making 46 league appearances and scoring 11 goals, as well as becoming one of the team's leaders. In February 2011 he went on trial with the Russian First Division club FC Baltika Kaliningrad and signed a contract with them. At the start of 2012 Rafaļskis left Baltika, returning to the Latvian Higher League and joining Daugava Daugavpils. He became the Latvian Higher League champion in 2012.
On 14 February 2013 Rafaļskis signed a 2-year deal with the Icelandic Pepsi League club ÍA.
 Prior to the 2014 Latvian Higher League season Rafaļskis joined FC Jūrmala. In September 2014 he moved to the Polish I liga club Wigry Suwałki, signing a one-year contract.

National team
Rafaļskis made his debut for Latvia national football team on 12 August 2009 in a friendly match against Bulgaria. So far he has played 13 games, scoring no goals.

References

External links
 
 Maksims Rafalskis at FTBL.com
 

1984 births
Living people
Latvian footballers
Latvian people of Russian descent
Footballers from Riga
Latvia international footballers
Latvian expatriate footballers
FK Liepājas Metalurgs players
FC Baltika Kaliningrad players
Expatriate footballers in Russia
Latvian expatriate sportspeople in Russia
FC Daugava players
Expatriate footballers in Iceland
Maksims, Rafalskis
FC Jūrmala players
Expatriate footballers in Poland
Latvian expatriate sportspeople in Poland
Wigry Suwałki players
Association football midfielders